This is a list of United Arab Emirates football transfers for the summer sale in 2011–12 season. Only moves from Pro-League are listed.

The summer transfer window will open on 1 June 2011, although a few transfers may take place prior to that date. The window will close on 31 August 2011.

Summer transfer window

References
 
	

United Arab Emirates
2011
Transfers